Tabir may refer to:

 A tabor, or Wagon fort
 A drum, see Tabor (instrument)

See also
 Tabar (disambiguation)
 Taber, Alberta, a town in southern Alberta, Canada
 Tabor (disambiguation)